Nemaschema puberulum is a species of beetle in the family Cerambycidae. It was described by Xavier Montrouzier in 1861.

References

Enicodini
Beetles described in 1861